Thomas Carl Chaminda Hedlund (born May 13, 1980) is a Sri Lankan-born Swedish drummer. He is currently the drummer for Swedish post-metal band Cult of Luna and Swedish indie rock band Deportees. Additionally, he is the touring drummer for French indie pop band Phoenix and previously played drums for The Perishers and Khoma. Hedlund has also been a session drummer and touring drummer for many other musical acts based in Europe.

History
Born in Sri Lanka, Hedlund was raised in Umeå, Västerbotten. As a youth, Hedlund played football competitively, before switching his focus to music after picking up the drums and joining the Swedish band, The Perishers.

In the years following his shift to music, Hedlund has become one of Sweden's most versatile drummers, most notably performing, as both a touring and session member, with the Swedish band, Cult of Luna and the French band, Phoenix. Hedlund's dynamic and modern playing style has a characteristic which, despite the aforementioned bands' great musical differences, makes Hedlund's playing recognizable.

In addition to his technical skill, he also possesses a great rhythmic imagination, which has made him internationally sought-after. Aside from his work with Phoenix and Cult of Luna, Hedlund has also performed live and on studio recordings for the likes of Deportees, The Lost Patrol, Miike Snow, Convoj, Rasmus Kellerman, BOY, CANT, and iamamiwhoami to name a few.

Outside of his musical endeavours, Hedlund also works for a branch of the Swedish Arts Council as a grant committee member, which distributes scholarships and financial assistance to Swedish individuals professionally involved in the fine arts.

Discography
with BOY
Mutual Friends (2011)

 with CANT 
 Dreams Come True (2011)

with Convoj 
 Exceptionnel (2008)

with Cult of Luna
 The Beyond (2003)
 Salvation (2004)
 Somewhere Along the Highway (2006)
 Eternal Kingdom (2008)
 Vertikal (2013)
 Mariner (with Julie Christmas) (2016)
 A Dawn to Fear (2019)
 The Long Road North (2022)

with Deportees
 All Prayed Up (2004)
 Damaged Goods (2006)
 Under the Pavement – The Beach (2009)
 Islands & Shores (2011)
 The Big Sleep (2015)
 All Future (2019)

with Khoma
 Tsunami (2004)
 The Second Wave (2006)
 A Final Storm (2010)
 All Erodes (2012)

with iamamiwhoami
 CONCERT IN BLUE (2015)

 with The Lost Patrol 
 Songs About Running Away (2003)
 Scattered, Smothered & Covered EP (2002)
 Creepy Cool (2001)
 The Lost Patrol (instrumentals) (1999)

with Miike Snow
Happy to You (2011)

with The Perishers
 From Nothing to One (2002)
 Let There Be Morning (2003)
 Victorious (2007)

with Phoenix
It's Never Been Like That (2006)
 Wolfgang Amadeus Phoenix (2009)
 Bankrupt! (2013)
 Ti Amo (2017)
 Alpha Zulu (2022)

with Plastic Pride
 No Hot Ashes (1998)

with Simian Ghost
 Simian Ghost (2017)

References

Swedish heavy metal drummers
Swedish people of Sri Lankan descent
1980 births
Living people